Carlo Alberto Rosselli (Rome, 16 November 1899Bagnoles-de-l'Orne, 9 June 1937) was an Italian  political leader, journalist, historian, philosopher and anti-fascist activist, first in Italy and then abroad. He developed a theory of reformist, non-Marxist socialism inspired by the British Labour movement that he described as "liberal socialism". Rosselli founded the anti-fascist militant movement Giustizia e Libertà. Rosselli personally took part in combat in the Spanish Civil War, where he served on the Republican side.

Life

Birth, war and studies 
Rosselli was born in Rome to a wealthy Tuscan Jewish family. His mother, Amelia Pincherle Rosselli, had been active in republican politics and thought and had participated in the unification of Italy.  She was also a playwright and children's book author. In 1903 he was taken to Florence with his mother and siblings. During the First World War he joined the Italian armed forces and fought in the alpine campaign, rising to the rank of second lieutenant.

After the war, thanks to his brother Nello, he studied in Florence with Gaetano Salvemini, who was to be from then a constant companion of both the Rosselli brothers. It was in this period that he became a socialist, sympathetic to the reformist ideas of Filippo Turati, in contrast to the revolutionary thinking of Giacinto Menotti Serrati. In 1921 he graduated with a degree in political sciences from the University of Florence with a thesis titled: "sindacalismo" (Syndicalism). Later he undertook a law degree that he would pursue in Turin and Milan, where he met Luigi Einaudi and Piero Gobetti.

He graduated in 1923 from the University of Siena. For some weeks he visited London where he studied the workings of the British Labour Party: the Labour movement in the UK would deeply influence him.

Rise of Fascism 
An active supporter of the Unitary Socialist Party of Turati, Matteotti and Treves, he began writing for "Critica Sociale", a review edited by Turati. After the murder of Matteotti, Rosselli pushed for a  more active opposition to Fascism. With the help of Ernesto Rossi and Gaetano Salvemini he founded the clandestine publication "Non mollare" (Don't give up). During the following months, fascist violence towards the left became increasingly severe. Ernesto Rossi left the country for France, followed by Salvemini.  On 15 February 1926 fellow activist Piero Gobetti died as an exile in Paris for the consequences of a fascist aggression happened in Turin the year before. Still in Italy, Rosselli and Pietro Nenni founded the review "Quarto Stato", which was banned after a few  months.

Later in 1926, he organized with Sandro Pertini and Ferruccio Parri the escape of Turati to France. While Pertini followed Turati to France, Parri and Rosselli were captured and convicted for their roles in Turati's escape and sentenced to a period of confinement on the island of Lipari (1927). It is then that Rosselli began to write his most famous work, "Liberal Socialism". In July 1929 he escaped to Tunisia, from where he travelled to France, and the community of Italian antifascists including Emilio Lussu and Francesco Fausto Nitti. Nitti later portrayed Rosselli's adventurous escape in the book Le nostre prigioni e la nostra evasione (Our Prisons and Our Escape) in an Italian edition in 1946 (the 1929 English first edition was titled Escape).

Exile in Paris and Giustizia e Libertà

In 1929, with Cianca, Lussu, Nitti, and a Parisian circle of refugees which had formed around Salvemini, Rosselli helped found the anti-fascist movement "Giustizia e Libertà". GL various numbers of the review and the notebooks omonimi (with cadence weekly magazine and salary) and was active in the organization of various spectacular actions,  notable among which was the flight over Milan of Bassanesi (1930). In 1930 he published, in French, "Socialisme Libéral".

The book was at once a passionate critique of Marxism, a creative synthesis of the democratic socialist revisionism  (Bernstein, Turati and Treves) and of classical Italian Liberalism (Benedetto Croce, Francisco Saverio Merlino and Gaetano Salvemini). But it contained also a shattering attack on the Stalinism of the Third International, which had, with the derisive formula of  "social fascism", lumped  together social democracy, bourgeois liberalism and fascism. It was not surprising, therefore, when one of the most important Italian Communists, Togliatti, defined "liberal Socialism" "libellous anti-socialism" and Rosselli "a reactionary ideologue who has nothing to do with the working class".

Giustizia e Libertà joined the Concentrazione Antifascista Italiana (The Italian Anti-Fascist Concentration), a union of all the non-communist anti-fascist forces (republican, socialist, nationalist) trying to promote and to coordinate expatriate actions to fight fascism in Italy. They also first published a weekly political magazine also entitled Giustizia e Libertà. Rosselli was the founding editor of the weekly and served in the post from 1934 to 1937. Following his assassination in 1937 Alberto Cianca replaced him in the post.

After the advent of Nazism in Germany (1933), the paper began to call for insurgency,  revolutionary action, and military action in order to stop the Italian and German regimes before they plunge Europe into a tragic war. Spain, they wrote, seems the destiny of all fascist states.

Spanish Civil War 
In July 1936, the Spanish Civil War erupted as the fascist-monarchical led army attempted a coup d'état against the republican government of the Popular Front. Rosselli helped lead the Italian anti-fascist supporters of the republican forces, criticizing the neutrality policy of France and Britain, especially as Italy and Germany sent arms and troops in support of the rebels. In August, Rosselli and the GL organized its own brigades of volunteers to support the Spanish Republic.

With Camillo Berneri, Rosselli headed the Matteotti Battalion, a mixed volunteer unit of anarchist, liberal, socialist and communist Italians. The unit was sent to the Aragon front, and participated in a victory against Francoist forces in the Battle of Monte Pelato. Speaking on Barcelona Radio in November, Rosselli made famous the slogan: "Oggi in Spagna, domani in Italia" ("Today in Spain, tomorrow in Italy").

After falling ill, Rosselli was sent back to Paris, from where he led support for the anti-fascist cause, and proposed an even broader 'popular front' while still remaining critical of the Communist Party of Spain and the Soviet government of Joseph Stalin. In 1937, Berneri was killed by Communist forces during a purge of anarchists in Barcelona. With the fall of the Spanish Republic in 1939, Giustizia e Libertà partisans were forced to flee back to France.

Murder 
In June 1937, Carlo Rosselli and his brother visited the French resort town of Bagnoles-de-l'Orne. On 9 June, the two were killed by a group of "cagoulards", militants of the Cagoule, a French fascist group, with archival documents implicating Mussolini's regime in authorizing the murder. The two brothers were buried in the Père Lachaise Cemetery in Paris but in the 1951 the family moved them to Italy into the Monumental Cemetery of Trespiano, a frazione of Florence.

His British-origin wife Marion Catherine Cave, their three children, Giovanni Andrea "John", Amelia "Melina", and Andrew, and his mother Amelia Pincherle Rosselli survived him.

Thought
Carlo Rosselli published only one book, Liberal Socialism. This work marked Rosselli out as a heretic in the Italian left of his time (for which Karl Marx's Das Kapital, albeit variously understood, was still regarded as the only reliable source of political analysis and guidance). Undoubtedly the influence of the British labour movement, which he knew well, is visible. As a result of the electoral successes of the Labour Party, Rosselli was convinced that the 'norms' of liberal democracy were essential, not only in building Socialism, but also for its concrete realization.  This stands in contrast to Leninist tactics which prioritize organizational power over democratic procedures. This 'Rossellian' synthesis is that "[parliamentary] liberalism is the method, Socialism is the aim".

The Marxist–Leninist idea of revolution founded on the dictatorship of the proletariat (which he felt, as in the Russian case, was synonymous with the dictatorship of a single party) he rejected in favour of a revolution that—as famously put in the GL program—is a coherent system of structural reforms aimed at the construction of a Socialism; that does not limit, but indeed exalts, freedom of personality and of association. Writing in his final years, Rosselli became more radical in his libertarian positions, defending the social organization of the CNT-FAI he had seen in anarchist Catalonia and Barcelona during the civil war, and informed by the rise of Nazi Germany.

Works
 Carlo Rosselli, Liberal Socialism. Edited by Nadia Urbinati. Translated by William McCuaig (Princeton: Princeton University Press 1994).

References

Bibliography 
 
 
 Pugliese, Stanislao G. (1999), Carlo Rosselli: Socialist Heretic and Antifascist Exile, Harvard University Press,

Further reading

External links

 "Why Carlo Rosselli Was Assassinated", Giustizia e Libertà, year IV, no. 25, June 18, 1937
  "Carlo Rosselli e l'altro socialismo" Links and Timeline
  Biography of Rosselli
  Biography, information and other links on Giustizia e Libertà and Carlo Rosselli
  "Italian Life Under Fascism: Opposition to Fascism"

1899 births
1937 deaths
Politicians from Rome
Italian military personnel of World War I
Members of Giustizia e Libertà
Exiled Italian politicians
20th-century Italian philosophers
Italian people of the Spanish Civil War
Italian social liberals
Assassinated Italian people
20th-century Italian Jews
Jewish socialists
University of Siena alumni
Italian anti-fascists
Italian people murdered abroad
Deaths by stabbing in France
People murdered in France
Unitary Socialist Party (Italy, 1922) politicians
20th-century Italian politicians
Terrorism deaths in France
Assassinated activists
Burials at Père Lachaise Cemetery
Jewish anti-fascists
Italian political party founders
Italian magazine founders
Italian Anti-Francoists